The 3rd World is the third studio album by rapper Immortal Technique, following a five-year absence since Revolutionary Vol. 2. It was released on June 24, 2008, on Viper Records. The 3rd World peaked at number 99 on the Billboard 200 chart. He claimed in an interview from September 2009 to have sold more than 60,000 copies. The album was conceived while recording material for other forthcoming projects with DJ Green Lantern and Southpaw.

In 2009 Immortal Technique used the proceeds from this album to fund and construct an orphanage in Afghanistan.

Track listing 

(Hidden Tracks: "Apocalypse Remix” ft. Akir & Pharoahe Monch, "Watchout Remix”, and "Rebel Arms" ft. Da Circle & J. Arch)

Samples 
"Golpe De Estado" samples "Marcia Religiosa" by City of Prague Philharmonic
"Mistakes" samples "I Made A Mistake" by Bob Marley and the Wailers

Chart positions

References

2008 albums
Immortal Technique albums
Albums produced by DJ Green Lantern
Albums produced by Scram Jones
Albums produced by Buckwild
Albums produced by Bronze Nazareth